Tarbagatay (Tarbagata) is a rural locality (a selo) in Tarbagataysky District of the Republic of Buryatia, Russia. Population:

References 

Rural localities in Tarbagataysky District